Chris Palmer may refer to:

 Chris Palmer (footballer) (born 1983), English footballer
 Chris Palmer (American football) (born 1949), American football coach
 Chris Palmer (film producer) (born 1947), environmental and wildlife film producer and director
 Chris Palmer (Nova Scotia politician), Canadian politician
 Chris Palmer (Prince Edward Island politician), Canadian politician

See also
 Christopher Palmer (1946–1995), English film score arranger, historian, biographer
 Christopher Palmer (born 1985), American author, educator, pastor